Dr Arthur Grant MacGregor, LVO, FSA, FLS (b. 31 May 1941) is a British academic. For much of his career (1979–2008) he was a curator at the Ashmolean Museum, University of Oxford. He has been editor of the Journal of the History of Collections since 1989 to the present and since 2019 has been an Andrew W. Mellon Visiting Professor at the Victoria and Albert Museum’s Research Institute on a project entitled ‘The India Museum Revisited’.

Early life and education 
Born and raised in the Scottish Highlands, MacGregor joined the RAF at fifteen as a boy entrant (armourer). After purchasing his discharge at twenty-one he attended a two-year course at Ealing School of Photography and worked for four years as a photographer for the Ministry of Public Building and Works, principally for the Inspectorate of Ancient Monuments. In 1968, he enrolled as an undergraduate at the University of Edinburgh, graduating MA Hons in European Prehistory in 1972. In that year he was appointed as a researcher (later deputy director) at the newly established York Archaeological Trust, where he developed and coordinated research on artefacts (Roman to post-medieval) over the next seven years. Concurrently he undertook research for an external MPhil at Durham on the utilization of skeletal materials (Roman to nineteenth century), awarded in 1981.

Later professional career 
In 1979 MacGregor was appointed a curator in the Department of Antiquities at the Ashmolean Museum, University of Oxford, with responsibility for the Late Saxon, medieval and post-medieval collections, later extended to include Late Roman, early Anglo-Saxon and Continental Migration Period antiquities. He found himself with charge of the Tradescant collection, with which the museum had been founded in 1683. Preparation of a major analytical volume to celebrate the museum’s tercentenary, Tradescant’s Rarities. Essays on the Foundation of the Ashmolean Museum, 1683 (Clarendon Press, 1983), opened up for him a new field of interest in the history of collecting. The anniversary was further celebrated with a week-long symposium, organized by MacGregor along with Oliver Impey (1936–2005), the proceedings of which they edited and published as The Origins of Museums. The Cabinet of Curiosities in Sixteenth– and Seventeenth–Century Europe (Oxford University Press, 1985). The success of this volume persuaded the publishers to launch a periodical – the Journal of the History of Collections – to foster the development of interest in the subject; this MacGregor edited with Dr Impey until the latter’s death in 2005 and has continued to do so since that time, with Dr Kate Heard as Deputy Editor (succeeded in January 2023 by Rea Alexandratos). Now in its 35th year, the journal is established among the leading publications in its field and with a truly international audience.

Engagement with a series of major figures in the history of collecting in Britain also led MacGregor to publish a number of edited volumes: The Late King’s Goods (McAlpine/OUP, 2001), dealing with King Charles I’s collections; Sir Hans Sloane, Collector, Scientist, Antiquary (British Museum Press, 1994); and Sir John Evans: Antiquity, Commerce and Natural Science in the Age of Darwin (Ashmolean Museum, 2008), as well as numerous papers on more detailed aspects of the subject. His research to date on early collections was synthesized in a survey volume titled Curiosity and Enlightenment (Yale University Press, 2007), since which time further works have continued to appear under his authorship and editorship. A continuing engagement with the history of natural history produced a further edited volume, Naturalists in the Field. Collecting, Recording and Preserving the Natural World from the Fifteenth to the Twenty-first Century (Brill, 2018).

In 2013 he was the recipient of a Festschrift, Excalibur: Essays on Antiquity and the History of Collecting in Honour of Arthur MacGregor, ed. H. Wiegel and M. Vickers.

Awards and recognition 
MacGregor’s publications in the fields of archaeology, archaeozoology and museology led to the award of a DLitt from Durham University in 1999. By far the weightiest such project has been the 37-volume Paper Museum of Cassiano dal Pozzo (Royal Collection Trust, 1996–), for which MacGregor has been co-general editor (with Jennifer Montagu) since 2000 and which earned him appointment as a Lieutenant of the Royal Victorian Order in The Queen’s Birthday Honours, 2021.

Associations 
MacGregor’s other associations include the Society of Antiquaries (elected FSA 1980, Director 1996-2001), the Linnean Society (elected FLS 2006) and the Society of the History of Natural History (elected President 2015-18). He also served for a time as Director of the British Archaeological Association (1991-6) and as a Vice-President of the Royal Archaeological Institute (2006-9). He was a Fellow of St Cross College, Oxford, between 1998 and 2008, and has been a Freeman of the Company of Arts Scholars honoris causa since 2011.

The India Museum Revisited 
Having developed an interest in the collecting activities of the East India Company with his book Company Curiosities. Nature, Culture and the East India Company (Reaktion Books, 2018), MacGregor was awarded a Visiting Professorship at the V&A Research Institute to look more specifically at the museum formed in London by the East India Company and the 20,000 artefacts transferred from it to the South Kensington Museum (later the V&A) in 1879.

Apart from a handful of star exhibits, little consciousness of the overall character and content of the India Museum has survived. In recent years, with increasing interest in the history of the colonial period, more frequent mention has been made of the museum but the lack of accessible detail on the collections has led to confusion about and misrepresentation of its original role. Under the title The India Museum Revisited and with support from the Andrew W. Mellon Foundation, MacGregor’s project has aimed to produce a narrative account of the history of the India Museum and its collections together with biographical information on donors to the collection and provenances of the exhibits, including a gazetteer of the source communities with an accompanying map. A book under the same title is currently in press with V&A/UCL Press for publication in 2023. The work is based on the 492-page inventory recording the collection’s arrival in 1880, the responses of visitors to the museum over its eighty-years of independent existence, the role of the collections in relation to the international exhibitions of the later nineteenth century, and a range of related topics. The volume will be extensively illustrated while an associated website will reproduce supporting material.

Select bibliography from the past ten years 
Animal Encounters. Human and Animal Interaction in Britain from the Norman Conquest to World War One (Reaktion Books, 2012)

[co–editor] From Books to Bezoars. Sir Hans Sloane and his Collections (British Library, 2012)

'Aristocrats and others: collectors of influence in eighteenth–century England', in British Models of Art Collecting and the American Response. Reflections across the Pond, ed. I. Reist (Frick Collection, 2014), pp. 73–85

[editor and contributor] The Cobbe Cabinet of Curiosities. An Anglo–Irish Country House Museum (London, Yale University Press for the Paul Mellon Centre, 2015).

Company Curiosities. Nature, Culture and the East India Company (Reaktion Books, 2018)

[editor and contributor] Naturalists in the Field. Collecting, Recording and Preserving the Natural World from the Fifteenth to the Twenty-first Century (Brill, 2018).

'Naturalia, curiosities, and the English cabinet', in The Paston Treasure. Microcosm of the Known World, ed. A. Moore, N. Flis and F. Vanke (Yale Center for British Art and Norfolk Museums Service, 2018), pp. 156–61

'Fortifications in the sand: modelling and military education in the nineteenth century', Journal of the Society for Army Historical Research 96 no. 387, pp. 251–6

‘The Levant Company and British collecting’, in Wonders Lost and Found. A celebration of the archaeological work of Professor Michael Vickers, ed. N. Sekunda (Oxford, Archaeopress, 2020), pp. 185–93

'Cabinets of curiosities – Tracing the Elusive Afterlife of a Concept: from the Theatre of the World to the omnium gatherum', Kunstkamera no. 4(10) (2020), pp. 9–19

‘Maria Sibylla Merian. “Between art and science, between nature observation and artistic intent”’, in Maria Sibylla Merian. Changing the Nature of Art and Science, ed. B. van de Roemer, F. Pieters, H. Mulder, K. Etheridge and M. van Delft (Tielt, Lannoo Publishers, 2022), pp. 15-23

‘Imaginer l’Inde: développement stratégique des collections du musée de la Compagnie britannique des Indes orientales et reactions des visiteurs au début du XIX siècle’, in Les universalités muséales aux XIXe at XXe siècles, ed. H. Inglebert and S. Kemp (Paris, Presses universitaires de Paris Nanterre, 2022), pp. 41–53

References

Living people
Academics of the University of Oxford
People associated with the Ashmolean Museum
Year of birth missing (living people)